For Those Who Dare is the fifth studio album by the American heavy metal band Chastain, released in 1990 through Leviathan Records. New members David Harbour and John Luke Hebert were part of the band that played in Leather Leone solo album Shock Waves in 1989.

Track listing
All songs by David T. Chastain, except tracks 1, 4, 9, 10, lyrics by Leather Leone and "Barracuda" by Ann Wilson, Nancy Wilson, Michael DeRosier, Roger Fisher

"The Mountain Whispers" – 4:25
"For Those Who Dare" - 4:07
"Please Set Us Free" - 6:04
"I Am the Rain" - 3:34
"Night of Anger" - 6:23
"Barracuda" - 4:04 (Heart cover)
"Light in the Dark" - 5:23
"Secrets of the Damned" - 4:48
"Not Much Breathing" - 4:01
"Once Before" - 6:17

Personnel

Band members
Leather Leone - vocals
David T. Chastain - guitars, keyboards, backing vocals, producer
David Harbour - bass
John Luke Hebert - drums

Production
Dale "Smitty" Smith, Jimmy Robinson, Steve Fontano - engineers
John Cuniberti - mixing

References

1990 albums
Chastain (band) albums
Roadrunner Records albums